Chlorozotocin is a nitrosourea. It is used for cancer therapy.

The International Agency for Research on Cancer concluded it was "probably carcinogenic" in 1990

It is an analogue of streptozotocin.

References

Alkylating antineoplastic agents
IARC Group 2A carcinogens
Monosaccharide derivatives
Nitrosoureas
Chloroethyl compounds